Barry Nugent is an Irish sportsperson.  He plays hurling with his local club Éire Óg and has been a member of the Clare senior hurling panel since 2003.

Playing career

Club
Nugent plays his club hurling and football with Ennis based club Éire Óg.

References

Living people
Clare inter-county hurlers
Éire Óg Ennis hurlers
People from Ennis
Garda Síochána officers
Year of birth missing (living people)